Ostrov Amel'kina Griva is a Russian island located in Lake Chany, Russia, approximately 7 km from Bekhten.

References

Further reading

External links
 Ostrov Amel'kina Griva at world-geographics.com
 Ostrov Amel'kina Griva at MapPlanet.com
 Ostrov Amel'kina Griva at GeoNames
 Ostrov Amel'kina Griva at Mapcarta
 Ostrov Amel'kina Griva at Geographic.org

Islands of Lake Chany
Landforms of Novosibirsk Oblast